Alamein or El Alamein may refer to:

El Alamein, a town in Egypt
 First Battle of El Alamein, during World War II
 Second Battle of El Alamein, during World War II
Alamein railway line, Melbourne, Australia
Alamein railway station on the line
HMS Alamein (D17), a  Royal Navy destroyer

See also
 Enham Alamein, a village in Hampshire in England